In physics, complementarity is a conceptual aspect of quantum mechanics that Niels Bohr regarded as an essential feature of the theory. The complementarity principle holds that objects have certain pairs of complementary properties which cannot all be observed or measured simultaneously. An example of such a pair is position and momentum. Bohr considered one of the foundational truths of quantum mechanics to be the fact that setting up an experiment to measure one quantity of a pair, for instance the position of an electron, excludes the possibility of measuring the other, yet understanding both experiments is necessary to characterize the object under study. In Bohr's view, the behavior of atomic and subatomic objects cannot be separated from the measuring instruments that create the context in which the measured objects behave. Consequently, there is no "single picture" that unifies the results obtained in these different experimental contexts, and only the "totality of the phenomena" together can provide a completely informative description.

History
Niels Bohr apparently conceived of the principle of complementarity during a skiing vacation in Norway in February and March 1927, during which he received a letter from Werner Heisenberg regarding an as-yet-unpublished result, a thought experiment about a microscope using gamma rays. This thought experiment implied a tradeoff between uncertainties that would later be formalized as the uncertainty principle. To Bohr, Heisenberg's paper did not make clear the distinction between a position measurement merely disturbing the momentum value that a particle carried and the more radical idea that momentum was meaningless or undefinable in a context where position was measured instead. Upon returning from his vacation, by which time Heisenberg had already submitted his paper for publication, Bohr convinced Heisenberg that the uncertainty tradeoff was a manifestation of the deeper concept of complementarity. Heisenberg duly appended a note to this effect to his paper, before its publication, stating:

Bohr has brought to my attention [that] the uncertainty in our observation does not arise exclusively from the occurrence of discontinuities, but is tied directly to the demand that we ascribe equal validity to the quite different experiments which show up in the [particulate] theory on one hand, and in the wave theory on the other hand.

Bohr publicly introduced the principle of complementarity in a lecture he delivered on 16 September 1927 at the International Physics Congress held in Como, Italy, attended by most of the leading physicists of the era, with the notable exceptions of Einstein, Schrödinger, and Dirac. However, these three were in attendance one month later when Bohr again presented the principle at the Fifth Solvay Congress in Brussels, Belgium. The lecture was published in the proceedings of both of these conferences, and was republished the following year in Naturwissenschaften (in German) and in Nature (in English).

In his original lecture on the topic, Bohr pointed out that just as the finitude of the speed of light implies the impossibility of a sharp separation between space and time (relativity), the finitude of the quantum of action implies the impossibility of a sharp separation between the behavior of a system and its interaction with the measuring instruments and leads to the well-known difficulties with the concept of 'state' in quantum theory; the notion of complementarity is intended to capture this new situation in epistemology created by quantum theory. Physicists F.A.M. Frescura and Basil Hiley have summarized the reasons for the introduction of the principle of complementarity in physics as follows:

Complementarity was a central feature of Bohr's reply to the EPR paradox, an attempt by Albert Einstein, Boris Podolsky and Nathan Rosen to argue that quantum particles must have position and momentum even without being measured and so quantum mechanics must be an incomplete theory. The thought experiment proposed by Einstein, Podolsky and Rosen involved producing two particles and sending them far apart. The experimenter could choose to measure either the position or the momentum of one particle. Given that result, they could in principle make a precise prediction of what the corresponding measurement on the other, faraway particle would find. To Einstein, Podolsky and Rosen, this implied that the faraway particle must have precise values of both quantities whether or not that particle is measured in any way. Bohr argued in response that the deduction of a position value could not be transferred over to the situation where a momentum value is measured, and vice versa.

Later expositions of complementarity by Bohr include a 1938 lecture in Warsaw and a 1949 article written for a festschrift honoring Albert Einstein. It was also covered in a 1953 essay by Bohr's collaborator Léon Rosenfeld.

Mathematical formalism
Complementarity is mathematically expressed by the operators that represent the observable quantities being measured failing to commute:

Observables corresponding to non-commuting operators are called incompatible observables. Incompatible observables cannot have a complete set of common eigenstates. The canonical commutation relation

implies that this applies to position and momentum. Likewise, an analogous relationship holds for any two of the spin observables defined by the Pauli matrices; measurements of spin along perpendicular axes are complementary. This has been generalized to discrete observables with more than two possible outcomes using mutually unbiased bases, which provide complementary observables defined on finite-dimensional Hilbert spaces.

See also
 Copenhagen interpretation
 Canonical coordinates
 Conjugate variables
 Interpretations of quantum mechanics
 Measurement in quantum mechanics
 Wave–particle duality

References

Further reading
 Berthold-Georg Englert, Marlan O. Scully & Herbert Walther, Quantum Optical Tests of Complementarity, Nature, Vol 351, pp 111–116 (9 May 1991) and (same authors) The Duality in Matter and Light Scientific American, pg 56–61, (December 1994).
 Niels Bohr, Causality and Complementarity: supplementary papers edited by Jan Faye and Henry J. Folse. The Philosophical Writings of Niels Bohr, Volume IV. Ox Bow Press. 1998.

External links

 Discussions with Einstein on Epistemological Problems in Atomic Physics
 Einstein's Reply to Criticisms

Quantum mechanics
Niels Bohr
Dichotomies
Scientific laws